Fu Taoying is a Chinese powerlifter. She is the top medalist in women's paralympic powerlifting, having won four gold medals at the Summer Paralympics.

References

External links
 

Year of birth missing (living people)
Living people
Chinese powerlifters
Female powerlifters
Paralympic powerlifters of China
Paralympic gold medalists for China
Paralympic medalists in powerlifting
Powerlifters at the 2004 Summer Paralympics
Powerlifters at the 2008 Summer Paralympics
Powerlifters at the 2012 Summer Paralympics
Medalists at the 2004 Summer Paralympics
Medalists at the 2008 Summer Paralympics
Medalists at the 2012 Summer Paralympics
21st-century Chinese women